Abraham Humberto Gómez Rodríguez (born 11 December 1988) was a Chilean footballer. His last club was Deportes Linares.

External links
 
 

1988 births
Living people
Chilean footballers
Rangers de Talca footballers
Chilean Primera División players
Primera B de Chile players
Association football defenders
People from Talca